Gary Walter Morice Tricker (24 September 1938 – 23 August 2021) was a New Zealand painter and printmaker. His prints and etchings featured themes including black cats, trains, rugby and railway clocks, often with a landscape background. He bequeathed almost of his 500 artworks to Waikato Museum. Other institutions that hold Tricker's work in their collections include the Museum of New Zealand Te Papa Tongarewa and the Govett-Brewster Art Gallery.

References

1938 births
2021 deaths
People from Wellington City
New Zealand painters
New Zealand printmakers